The Barbados Lottery is the national lottery in Barbados.

External links
Official website - Online

Barbadian culture
Lotteries
Gambling companies of Barbados